The Confederazione Italiana Sindacati Lavoratori (CISL; Italian Confederation of Trade Unions) is a national trade union centre in Italy representing various Catholic–inspired groups linked with Christian Democracy.

It was founded on 30 April 1950, when Catholics in the Italian General Confederation of Labour (CGIL) left after they clashed with the communists on the issue of a general strike provoked by the latter. Like the French Force Ouvrière (FO) union, it received financial support from Irving Brown, leader of the international relations of the US AFL–CIO and a CIA contractee.

Structure

The CISL is formed on two levels: a vertical one, grouping workers according to employment (such as transport, banks, and teaching), and the confederation itself, representing all categories. The base of the latter is formed by districts (or Unioni territoriali), grouped in regions. On the national level, CISL ensures cooperation of various branch organisms within the territorial hierarchy. The confederation holds regular Congresses that elect members to leadership positions.

History

After a difficult start and numerous disagreements between various trade unions represented, CISL managed to gain a voice through its representatives in the Italian Parliament, asking for increased and autonomous presence of the companies partly owned by the state. In 1956, owing to CISL initiatives, the latter had separated from the employers' group Confindustria and had formed the Intersind – meant to establish a new base for relation between the state and trade unions. In the late 1950s and early 1960s, the confederation coordinated strike actions of the metalworkers and workers in electromechanics, as well as the labour dispute in Milan. Its great success came in 1963, when it negotiated with electromechanics employers new bonuses, means of promotion, and awards in accordance with increased productivity. Nonetheless, trade union activities on factory grounds remained exceptionally difficult, and workers attempting them risked being sacked.

When the Italian economy sunk in the mid-1960s, CISL suffered an internal crisis as numerous of its branches believed the political function of the union to be incompatible with its labour goals. The 6th Congress it held in 1969 sanctioned the view, and renounced its activities in Parliament.

The following years proved to be especially tumultuous for Italy as a whole: while traditional trade unionism was being reshaped by the student movement and secondary impact of the decolonization and Third World ideologies, the local scene saw the advent of terrorism of the Red Brigades and the Neo-Fascist Strategy of tension (carried out by the National Vanguard). CISL doubled its specific activism with an advocacy of democracy, siding with the civil society. In July 1972, it co-founded the Federazione unitaria, meant as a transitional group, which became a rather bureaucratical institution. CISL signed an agreement with other national federations in 1975, calling for a readjustment of the salary-pension balance, as well as for a new minimum wage. Federazione unitaria also proposed a new tactic at its Congress in 1978, calling for a larger perspective of the unions – one mindful of the national economical policy. In 1983 CISL founded ISCOS, Trade Union Institute for Development Cooperation.

The gradual decrease of inflation in the 1980s and 1990s (again at under 10 per cent in 1984). The state intervention in the economy in order to decrease labour costs was sanctioned by the population in the 1985 Italian referendum, after being backed by accords in which the CISL played a major part (the policy was opposed by the confederation's left-wing, as well as by the CGIL and the Italian Communist Party). The CISL was part in two protocols with the Italian executive, in 1992 and 1993, both of which agreed to allow tight control of the inflation rate and government debt. From 1994 onwards, it convened to the creation of the Rappresentanze sindacali unitarie (Unitary Representatives of Trade Unions), a trans-federative organism meant to ensure a preliminary democratic agreement on all labour matters, and also intended as a step towards a new single trade union.

General Secretaries

Affiliates

Current affiliates

Former affiliates

See also

 Italian Labour Union

References

External links
Official website

1950 establishments in Italy
Catholic trade unions
European Trade Union Confederation
International Trade Union Confederation
National trade union centers of Italy
Trade Union Advisory Committee to the OECD
Trade unions established in 1950